Richard Plumer (c.1689–25 November 1750) was a British  politician who sat in the House of Commons from 1722 to 1750.
 
Plumer was the third surviving son of John Plumer, a wealthy London merchant of Blakesware, Hertfordshire, and his wife Mary Hale, daughter  of William Hale of King's Walden, Hertfordshire. He had brothers Walter  and William Plumer who were also in Parliament. He succeeded to his father's estates in Kent and Surrey in 1719.

Plumer was appointed Lord of Trade in 1721, and a year later at the 1722 general election he was elected  Member of Parliament for Lichfield on the interest of the Chetwynd family. He was returned again as MP for Lichfield at the 1722 general election, but in that year was dismissed from his office at the Board of Trade to make way for someone else.  He then voted selectively  – for the Administration  on the civil list arrears in 1729 and on the repeal of the Septennial Act in 1734, but against the Administration on the Hessians in 1730, the army in 1732, and the Excise Bill in 1733. At the 1734 general election he was returned as MP for St Mawes on the recommendation of Walpole. He was re-appointed as Lord of Trade in 1735 and from then on voted consistently with the Administration. In 1741 he was brought in unopposed as MP for Aldburgh and in  1747  returned unopposed  for Weymouth and Melcombe Regis.

Plumer was operated on for a stone on 18 November 1750 and died a week later on 25 November unmarried.

References

.

1680s births
1750 deaths
Members of the Parliament of Great Britain for English constituencies
British MPs 1722–1727
British MPs 1727–1734
British MPs 1734–1741
British MPs 1741–1747
British MPs 1747–1754